Wesley Chapel is a village in Union County, North Carolina, United States. The population was 7,463 at the 2010 census and 8,681 at the 2020 census.

Geography
Wesley Chapel is located at  (35.010027, -80.679163).

Demographics

2020 census

As of the 2020 United States census, there were 8,681 people, 2,620 households, and 2,343 families residing in the village.

2000 census
At the 2000 census there were 2,549 people, 867 households, and 762 families in the village. The population density was 302.8 people per square mile (116.9/km). There were 912 housing units at an average density of 108.3 per square mile (41.8/km).  The racial makeup of the village was 97.02% White, 1.41% African American, 0.12% Native American, 0.31% Asian, 0.04% Pacific Islander, 0.35% from other races, and 0.75% from two or more races. Hispanic or Latino of any race were 1.88%.

Of the 867 households 43.9% had children under the age of 18 living with them, 79.4% were married couples living together, 5.5% had a female householder with no husband present, and 12.0% were non-families. 9.3% of households were one person and 2.5% were one person aged 65 or older. The average household size was 2.94 and the average family size was 3.14.

The age distribution was 29.1% under the age of 18, 6.2% from 18 to 24, 32.1% from 25 to 44, 25.9% from 45 to 64, and 6.7% 65 or older. The median age was 37 years. For every 100 females, there were 104.2 males. For every 100 females age 18 and over, there were 100.7 males.

The median household income was $74,188 and the median family income  was $73,000. Males had a median income of $41,620 versus $30,739 for females. The per capita income for the village was $30,143. About 4.1% of families and 3.4% of the population were below the poverty line, including 2.4% of those under age 18 and 10.4% of those age 65 or over.

References

External links
 Official website of Wesley Chapel, NC

Villages in Union County, North Carolina
Villages in North Carolina